Valeria Dmitrievna Tarakanova (born 20 June 1998) is a Russian ice hockey goaltender, currently playing in the Zhenskaya Hockey League (ZhHL) with SKIF Nizhny Novgorod. 

She represented  at the 2015 IIHF Women's World Championship and is a two-time Winter Universiade gold medalist, having participated in the Russian victories in the women's ice hockey tournament at the 2017 Winter Universiade and in the women's ice hockey tournament at the 2019 Winter Universiade. With the Olympic Athletes from Russia women's national ice hockey team, she participated in the women's ice hockey tournament at the 2018 Winter Olympics in Peyongchang.

As a junior player with the Russian national under-18 team, Tarakanova participated in the IIHF Women's U18 World Championships in 2014, 2015, and 2016. At the 2015 tournament, she backstopped the Russian team to a bronze medal victory with a .919 save percentage and 2.74 goals against average while playing in all six games. In recognition of her outstanding play, she was selected as Best Goaltender by the tournament directorate, named to the media All-Star Team, and chosen as a top-3 player on the Russian team by the coaches. At the 2016 tournament, she again served as the starting netminder, playing in all six games and registering a .901 save percentage and 2.91 goals against average, as Russia fell to Sweden in the bronze medal match. Despite narrowly missing the medal podium, Tarakanova was singled out as the tournament MVP by the media and, in a repeat of the previous year, chosen as a top-3 player on the Russian team.

References

External links
 
 

1998 births
Living people
Russian women's ice hockey goaltenders
Ice hockey players at the 2018 Winter Olympics
Olympic ice hockey players of Russia
People from Zavolzhye, Nizhny Novgorod Oblast
HC SKIF players
Sportspeople from Nizhny Novgorod Oblast
Universiade gold medalists for Russia
Universiade medalists in ice hockey
Competitors at the 2017 Winter Universiade
Competitors at the 2019 Winter Universiade